UBH is an abbreviation for:
 Unbihexium, symbol Ubh for '126', a theoretical chemical element
 United Behavioral Health, the behavioral health subsidiary of medical insurer UnitedHealth Group
 Uriah Butler Highway